Iziwa is an administrative ward in the Mbeya Urban district of the Mbeya Region of Tanzania. In 2016 the Tanzania National Bureau of Statistics report there were 3,500 people in the ward, from 3,176 in 2012.

Neighborhoods 
The ward has 5 neighborhoods.
 Iduda
 Ilungu
 Imbega
 Isengo
 Isumbi

References 

Wards of Mbeya Region